Statistics of Primera Fuerza in season 1908–09.

Overview

In the 1907–08 tournament, Puebla withdrew from the Primera Fuerza due to the long distances they would have had to travel.  Reforma went on to win the championship.

League standings

Top goalscorers
Players sorted first by goals scored, then by last name.

References
Mexico – List of final tables (RSSSF)

1908-09
Mex
1908–09 in Mexican football